The Homer Brewing Company is a brewery in Homer, Alaska, near the southern end of the Kenai Peninsula. It was founded on September 21, 1996. The brewery specializes in unfiltered, unpasteurized, cask-conditioned beers.  Their beers are available in  growlers,  bottles and on tap in many local establishments.

Along with a winery, and Grace Ridge Brewing Co., it serves a town with a 2010 population of 5,003 people.

See also
List of Alaska breweries

References

External links

"Peninsula Beers", Anchorage Press article, May 11th, 2011
"The United States of Beer: Alaska", April 4th, 2011
"Drink in Homer's Flavors", Homer News page
"Bite and Booze.com's Top Ten of 2010"

1996 establishments in Alaska
Beer brewing companies based in Alaska
Buildings and structures in Kenai Peninsula Borough, Alaska
Food and drink companies established in 1996
Homer, Alaska 
American companies established in 1996